Rickarton is a settlement in Aberdeenshire. It is situated on the A957 to the northwest of Stonehaven. Rickarton was served by the 105 bus between Stonehaven and Banchory until its withdrawal in 2018.

Rickarton was home to a Church of Scotland church until its closure in the late 1970s.

References

Villages in Aberdeenshire